Xici or Xi Ci (Great Commentary) is one of the Ten Wings, a collection of Confucian books traditionally included in the I Ching written during the fifth century BC. Its origins are unknown, but it is suspected of being the product of scholars who did not believe prevailing Daoist thought. A silk manuscript version of it dating from 168 BCE was found at the Mawangdui site in Changsha in 1973. It's one of the most important sources about early Chinese cosmology. Among the mythologies stressed in the book is that of Fuxi, the emperor-god.

References

External links
Dictionary of Asian Mythology on HighBeam.com

I Ching